GDPase may refer to:
 Nucleoside-diphosphatase
 Guanosine-diphosphatase